Aganippe (Ancient Greek: Ἀγανίππη means 'mare who kills mercifully') was a name or epithet of several figures in Greek mythology:

Aganippe, a naiad of the spring Aganippe.
Aganippe, wife of King Acrisius of Argos, and according to some accounts the mother of Danaë and possibly Evarete. Although in some accounts, Eurydice was wife of Acrisius and the mother of Danae.
Aganippe, daughter of Termesus river.
Aganippe, an aspect of Demeter. In this form she was a black winged horse worshiped by certain cults. In this aspect her idols (such as one found in Mavrospelya, the Black Cave, in Phigalia) she was portrayed as mare-headed with a mane entwined with Gorgon Snakes. This aspect was also associated with Anion (or Arion) whom Heracles rode, who later inspired tales of Pegasus.
Aganippis, a name used by Ovid as an epithet of Hippocrene; its meaning however is not quite clear. It is derived from Aganippe, the well or nymph, and as "Aganippides" is used to designate the Muses, Aganippis Hippocrene may mean nothing more than "Hippocrene, sacred to the Muses".

Namesake 
Aganippe, a genus of trapdoor spiders

Notes

References
Apollodorus, The Library with an English Translation by Sir James George Frazer, F.B.A., F.R.S. in 2 Volumes, Cambridge, MA, Harvard University Press; London, William Heinemann Ltd. 1921. ISBN 0-674-99135-4. Online version at the Perseus Digital Library. Greek text available from the same website.
Bell, Robert E., Women of Classical Mythology: A Biographical Dictionary. ABC-Clio. 1991. .
Gaius Julius Hyginus, Fabulae from The Myths of Hyginus translated and edited by Mary Grant. University of Kansas Publications in Humanistic Studies. Online version at the Topos Text Project.
Graves, Robert, The Greek Myths, Harmondsworth, London, England, Penguin Books, 1960. 
Graves, Robert, The Greek Myths: The Complete and Definitive Edition. Penguin Books Limited. 2017. 
Pausanias, Description of Greece with an English Translation by W.H.S. Jones, Litt.D., and H.A. Ormerod, M.A., in 4 Volumes. Cambridge, MA, Harvard University Press; London, William Heinemann Ltd. 1918. Online version at the Perseus Digital Library
Pausanias, Graeciae Descriptio. 3 vols. Leipzig, Teubner. 1903.  Greek text available at the Perseus Digital Library.
Publius Ovidius Naso, Fasti translated by James G. Frazer. Online version at the Topos Text Project.
Publius Ovidius Naso, Fasti. Sir James George Frazer. London; Cambridge, MA. William Heinemann Ltd.; Harvard University Press. 1933. Latin text available at the Perseus Digital Library.
 Smith, William; Dictionary of Greek and Roman Biography and Mythology, London (1873). "Aganippe" 1.,  "Aganippe" 2., "Aganippis"

Queens in Greek mythology
Demeter